Marco Wittmann (born 24 November 1989) is a German professional racing driver, and BMW Motorsport works driver.

He currently resides in Markt Erlbach. Wittmann has competed in such series as Formula Three Euroseries and Formula BMW ADAC/Europe.

BMW signed Wittmann as the marque's 7th DTM driver, in an expansion to four teams with eight drivers and cars for the 2013 DTM season. He is the 2014 and 2016 DTM champion.

Racing record

Career summary

* Season still in progress.

Complete Formula 3 Euro Series results
(key)

Complete Deutsche Tourenwagen Masters results
(key) (Races in bold indicate pole position) (Races in italics indicate fastest lap)

† Driver did not finish, but completed 75% of the race distance.

Complete IMSA SportsCar Championship results
(key) (Races in bold indicate pole position; races in italics indicate fastest lap)

* Season still in progress.

References

External links

 
 

1989 births
Living people
Sportspeople from Fürth
Racing drivers from Bavaria
German racing drivers
Formula BMW ADAC drivers
Formula BMW Europe drivers
Formula 3 Euro Series drivers
Deutsche Tourenwagen Masters drivers
Deutsche Tourenwagen Masters champions
24 Hours of Daytona drivers
BMW M drivers
Nürburgring 24 Hours drivers
Blancpain Endurance Series drivers
WeatherTech SportsCar Championship drivers
Josef Kaufmann Racing drivers
Mücke Motorsport drivers
Schnitzer Motorsport drivers
Rowe Racing drivers
Rahal Letterman Lanigan Racing drivers
Karting World Championship drivers
Signature Team drivers